Aga is a genus of assassin bugs (family Reduviidae), in the subfamily Harpactorinae, containing a single described species, Aga albomarginalis.

References

Reduviidae
Insects described in 1910